Lin Yanqun (born 16 May 1996) is a Chinese handball player for Shandong Handball and the Chinese national team.

She represented China at the 2019 World Women's Handball Championship in Japan, where the Chinese team placed 23rd.

References

Chinese female handball players
1996 births
Living people
Handball players at the 2014 Summer Youth Olympics
Asian Games medalists in handball
Asian Games silver medalists for China
Medalists at the 2018 Asian Games
Handball players at the 2018 Asian Games